San Bruno is a populated place at the Gulf of California in Mulegé Municipality in the Mexican state of Baja California Sur. The town has a 2010 census population of 623 inhabitants and is situated at an elevation of 1 meter (3 ft.) above sea level.

Climate
This area has a large amount of sunshine year round due to its stable descending air and high pressure.  According to the Köppen Climate Classification system, San Bruno has a desert climate, abbreviated "BWh" on climate maps.

See also
 Spanish missions in Baja California

References

Populated places in Baja California Sur